Editor's Recommendation is a 2001 extended play CD by Birkenhead-based indie band Half Man Half Biscuit.

John Peel (19392004; BBC Radio 1 DJ 19672004), who greatly admired the band, included two tracks from Editor's Recommendation in his 2001 Festive Fifty: "Bob WilsonAnchorman" at No. 13 and "Vatican Broadside" at No. 16.

Track listing

Notes 
 Bob Wilson (born 1941) is a former footballer turned television sports presenter.
 An "anchorman" is a news presenter.
 The title "Lark Descending" parodies that of the poem The Lark Ascending by George Meredith (18281909) and of the well-known classical music piece based upon it by English composer Ralph Vaughan Williams (18721958).
 Skiffle is a music genre usually employing homemade or improvised instruments, originating in the United States in the first half of the 20th century and revived in the UK in the 1950s.
 The song "New York Skiffle" parodies the 1959 single "Does Your Chewing Gum Lose Its Flavour (On the Bedpost Overnight?)" by Scottish skiffle player Lonnie Donegan.
 The song "New York Skiffle" includes the line "I've had the CBGBs", and also references Andy Warhol and Greenwich Village.
     New York Skiffle could also a parody of a Graham Parker song New York Shuffle
 The Vatican, Rome includes the seat and bedchamber of the Pope, head of the Roman Catholic church.
 Slipknot, an American Nu metal band. "The singer" referred to is most likely Corey Taylor.

References

External links 
  The oldest-established Half Man Half Biscuit fansite.
  The Half Man Half Biscuit Lyrics Project.

2001 EPs
Half Man Half Biscuit albums